Lake Almanor is a large reservoir in northwestern Plumas County, northeastern California, United States. It is formed by Canyon Dam on the North Fork of the Feather River, as well as Benner and Last Chance Creeks, Hamilton Branch, and various natural springs.

Creation

The dam is 130 feet tall and composed of hydraulic fill.

The first dam was completed by Great Western Power in 1914 as part of the Upper North Fork Feather River Project, damming the North Fork of the Feather River and flooding the meadow-filled valley generally known as Nakam Koyo/Big Meadows/Big Springs, a longstanding Yamani Maidu village site.  When the dam was built, Maidu families still living in the vicinity were displaced, while parts of the town of Prattville had to be moved to higher ground, leaving multiple structures flooded over. The reservoir was named for the three daughters of Guy C. Earl, Vice President of Great Western Power: Alice, Martha and Eleanor. The present dam, which more than doubled the lake's size, was constructed by Great Western Power from 1926 to 1927.

The dam is now owned by Pacific Gas and Electric Company. PG&E uses it for hydroelectricity production, but the lake is also a popular recreation area, with fishing, boating, water skiing, swimming and camping available.

The California Office of Environmental Health Hazard Assessment has issued safe eating advice based on mercury for fish caught from Lake Almanor.

Geography

The lake-front and immediate surroundings are, either officially or unofficially, divided into a series of regions:

 North Shore, typically referring to the north-east shoreline and the campground of the same name
 The Peninsula, the major east-side peninsula bisecting the lake and largely taken up by the Lake Almanor Country Club, the community of Almanor, and the more recent residential developments known as Bailey Creek and Foxwood
 Hamilton Branch, the east-side community next south of the Peninsula, named for the river of the same name
 East Shore, both the developed and undeveloped areas between Hamilton Branch and the dam itself
 Canyon Dam (also known as Canyondam), the community just southeast of the dam
 South Shore, the southwest shoreline taken up largely by PG&E managed campgrounds and undeveloped grounds
 Prattville, the small resort community on the southwest shoreline; retains the same name as the town that was once in Big Meadows (now underwater)
 West Shore, on the upper southwest shore and more formally referred to as Lake Almanor West, itself an un-gated country-club
 The generally nameless western shoreline from Lake Almanor West to the town of Chester, starting at Goose Bay and ending at the termination of the large diversion channel that mitigates high-waters in the Feather River above Chester
 The northern shoreline from Chester, running northeast then southwest, and back to Hwy 36; includes the mouth of Benner and Last Chance creeks and seasonal springs

Much of the southern shore of the lake is in the Lassen National Forest, so recreation management is shared by PG&E and the United States Forest Service.

Large areas along the northern shore of the lake are seasonal pastures used for summer and fall cattle grazing; some areas of these grazing grounds are underwater in wetter years. The wetlands at the north end also serve as breeding grounds for a variety of migratory waterfowl, most prominently Canada geese and various species of ducks including mallard, teal, and wigeon. Other large birds to be viewed around the lake are heron, osprey, and occasionally bald eagles, which nest on the Peninsula and West Shore. Each year in late June and early July, large insect hatches occur on the lake during dusk. The insects on which the fish feed attract local fly fishermen who use imitation flies to catch the feeding fish.

The Almanor Basin Watershed Advisory Committee Group (ABWAC) received funding for a Watershed Assessment Project under California Prop 12, and one deliverable from this project was in an online map-based database of watershed information that runs on Google Earth. A tour can be downloaded.

Thermal curtain
PG&E's 50-year license to use the waters of Lake Almanor was set to expire in 2004 when the state water board explored requests to install a thermal curtain at the bottom of Lake Almanor to control the temperature of the rivers downstream. This was ostensible to create better habitat for trout habitat up to 40 miles downstream. However, residents near Lake Almanor became concerned that the curtain would help the trout downstream at the cost of raising the water temperatures of shallow Lake Almanor and harming its fish population. By doing so, the residents would not have easy access to the lake's fish.

Power production
There is no powerhouse at the dam. A tunnel (and finally a penstock) from the powerhouse outlet tower, in the lake between Prattville and the Plumas Pines Resort, delivers water to the Butt Valley Powerhouse at the north end of Butt Valley Reservoir, which has a capacity of 41 MW. From there, the water is sent by tunnel to either the Caribou 1 (74 MW) or Caribou 2 (120 MW) powerhouses. Caribou 2 is favored because it is newer and more efficient. Their tailraces flow into Belden Reservoir. A portion of the water goes through the 1.3-MW Oak Flat Powerhouse, which is located at the bottom of Belden Dam. The rest goes to the 125-MW Belden Powerhouse by another tunnel. The water is then released into Rock Creek Reservoir. As of 2008, all of these powerhouse facilities were owned and operated by the Pacific Gas and Electric Company (PG&E), a major investor-owned California utility.

See also
List of lakes in California
List of dams and reservoirs in California
List of largest reservoirs in the United States
List of largest reservoirs of California
Indigenous peoples of California

References

Bright, William. 1500 California Place Names: Their Origin and Meaning. University of California Press, Berkeley and Los Angeles, 1998.
Dixon, Roland B. Dixon. 1905. The Northern Maidu. Bulletin of the Museum of Natural History Vol. XVIII, Part III, pp. 119–346. (Huntington California Expedition).
Golla, Victor. 2011. California Indian Languages. University of California Press.

External links 

United States Forest Service

Reservoirs in Plumas County, California
Plumas National Forest
Reservoirs in California
Reservoirs in Northern California